Jules-Alexandre Duval Le Camus (5 August 1814, Paris - 23 June 1878, Saint-Cloud) was a French painter who specialized in portraits and genre scenes.

Biography 
He was the only son of the painter Pierre Duval Le Camus. After receiving his initial lessons from his father, he was admitted to the studios of Paul Delaroche and Martin Drolling at the École des beaux-arts de Paris. He was awarded second place at the Prix de Rome of 1838.

Although his style is almost indistinguishable from his father's, he preferred to paint on smaller canvases. In addition to his best-known scenes from daily life, he did some occasional depictions of Biblical and mythological subjects.

References

Further reading 
 Les Duval Le Camus, peintres de père en fils, (exhibition catalog), Saint-Cloud, 2010.

External links 

 Présentation de l'exposition "Les Duval Le Camus, peintres de père en fils", 2010, Musée des Avelines.

1814 births
1878 deaths
19th-century French painters
French male painters
Painters from Paris
19th-century painters of historical subjects
19th-century French male artists